Zirara is a town in Sidi Kacem Province, Rabat-Salé-Kénitra, Morocco. According to the 2004 census it has a population of 6,707.

References

Populated places in Sidi Kacem Province
Rural communes of Rabat-Salé-Kénitra